Agonist (from Ancient Greek ἀγωνιστής: agōnistēs, “combatant, champion”) may refer to:

A person engaged in a contest or struggle (see agon)
An advocate of the political theory of agonism (or "agonistic pluralism")
Agonist, a substance that binds to a receptor to induce a biochemical response
Inverse agonist, a substance that induces the opposite effect of an agonist
Agonist (muscle), a muscle type
The Agonist, a Canadian metal band
Agonistic behaviour, animal behaviour relating to conflict

See also

 
 Agonistes (fictional character), a fictional demon from the videogame Tortured Souls
 Samson Agonistes, a tragic closet drama John Milton
 Sweeney Agonistes, a verse drama by T.S. Eliot
Agonist-antagonist (pharmacology)
Combatant 
 
 Agon (disambiguation)
 Antagonist (disambiguation)
 Protagonist (disambiguation)
 Champion (disambiguation)